Faqir Zehi Nur Mohammad (also Romanized as Faqīr Zehī Nūr Moḩammad) is a village in Polan Rural District, Polan District, Chabahar County, Sistan and Baluchestan Province, Iran. At the 2006 census, its population was 349, in 52 families.

References 

Populated places in Chabahar County